Eucalyptus rhombica is a small to medium-sized tree that is endemic to a small area of south-east Queensland. It has rough, ironbark on the trunk and larger branches, smooth bark above, lance-shaped adult leaves, flower buds in groups of seven, white flowers and cup-shaped or conical fruit.

Description
It has rough grey or black ironbark on the trunk and larger branches, sometimes smooth bark on the thinner branches. Flowering occurs from September to March and the flowers are white.

Taxonomy and naming
Eucalyptus rhombica was first formally described in 1994 by Anthony Bean and Ian Brooker in the journal Austrobaileya from material collected in the Hungry Hills State Forest near Ceratodus. The specific epithet (rhombica) is from the Latin rhombicus, referring to the shape of the flower buds.

Distribution and habitat
This eucalypt is restricted to three areas near Toowoomba, Gayndah and Taroom, where it grows in sandy soil.

Conservation status
This eucalypt is listed as "least concern" under the Queensland Government Nature Conservation Act 1992.

See also
List of Eucalyptus species

References

Trees of Australia
rhombica
Myrtales of Australia
Flora of Queensland
Taxa named by Ian Brooker
Plants described in 1994